Waldemar Lemos de Oliveira, commonly known as Waldemar Lemos (born June 5, 1954), is a Brazilian professional football coach who currently manages Remo.

Born in Rio de Janeiro, he managed several clubs during his career as a head coach. With Fluminense, he won the Campeonato Carioca in 2002.

Honors
Fluminense
 Campeonato Carioca: 2002

Naútico
 Copa Pernambuco: 2011

Associação Brasileira de Treinadores de Futebol
 Vice Presidente: 2018

References

External links
Profile at Sambafoot

Living people
1954 births
Sportspeople from Rio de Janeiro (city)
Brazilian football managers
Expatriate football managers in Jamaica
Brazilian expatriate sportspeople in Jamaica
Brazilian expatriate sportspeople in South Korea
Expatriate football managers in South Korea
Campeonato Brasileiro Série A managers
Campeonato Brasileiro Série B managers
Campeonato Brasileiro Série C managers
Campeonato Brasileiro Série D managers
Mesquita Futebol Clube managers
São Cristóvão de Futebol e Regatas managers
Goytacaz Futebol Clube managers
Fluminense FC managers
CR Flamengo managers
Figueirense FC managers
Associação Desportiva Cabofriense managers
Paulista Futebol Clube managers
Joinville Esporte Clube managers
Harbour View F.C. managers
Clube Náutico Capibaribe managers
Club Athletico Paranaense managers
Pohang Steelers managers
Duque de Caxias Futebol Clube managers
Sport Club do Recife managers
Atlético Clube Goianiense managers
ABC Futebol Clube managers
América Futebol Clube (PE) managers
Vila Nova Futebol Clube managers
Boavista Sport Club managers
Anápolis Futebol Clube managers
Clube do Remo managers
Ríver Atlético Clube managers
Associação Atlética de Altos managers
Associação Atlética Anapolina managers